Tropics is the stage name of English electronic musician Chris Ward. Originally from Southampton England, he presently lives in Los Angeles.

History
 
In 2013, Tropics released his EP, titled Popup Cinema. That same year Tropics also released another EP titled Home & Consonance via Five Easy Pieces. In 2015, Tropics released his full-length album, titled Rapture, via Innovative Leisure. His fourth album, Nocturnal Souls, was released in 2018 through Plus Fours.

Discography
Studio albums
Parodia Flare (2011, Planet Mu)
Rapture (2015, Innovative Leisure)
Nocturnal Souls (2018, Plus Fours)
EPs
Soft Vision (2010, Planet Mu)
Home & Consonance (2013, Five Easy Pieces)
Popup Cinema (2013, Svetlana Industries)

References

English electronic musicians
2010 establishments in England
Living people
Year of birth missing (living people)